"Topanga" is a song by American rapper Trippie Redd. It was released on October 22, 2018, as the lead single from his third mixtape A Love Letter to You 3 by TenThousand Projects. The title of the song references the city of Topanga, California.

Background
In September 2018, Trippie Redd posted a snippet of the song as well as the single's cover, which was inspired by one of his personal muses, Gorillaz. He appears in religious attire while levitating in the artwork. Redd premiered the song through Zane Lowe's Beats 1 on October 22, 2018. He described the song as "Singing real shit that people all over the world can relate to — timeless."

Composition
The song has been described as "mellow" and samples "It Ain't Over" by Maurette Brown Clark. It begins with melodic piano riff and moves into an uptempo instrumental.

Charts

Certifications

References

2018 singles
2018 songs
Trippie Redd songs
Songs written by Trippie Redd